Christoph "Chris" Karrer (born 20 January 1947, Kempten, Germany) is a German guitarist and composer. He also plays oud, saxophone and violin. He is known as co-founder of the Amon Düül commune and a member of the related and much more commercially successful project Amon Düül II) and for his collaboration  with Embryo.
With his band Amon Düül II he composed film music for Rainer Werner Fassbinder's  and Hans-Jürgen Syberberg's  film San Domingo (Deutscher Filmpreis 1971 for film music).

Discography

 with Amon Düül II
 with Embryo

Solo

 Chris Karrer LP (1980) with  Curt Cress
 Dervish Kiss  (1994) with Sivan Perwer and Rabih Abou-Khalil
 Sufisticated CD (1996)
 The Mask CD  (1997) with Mani Neumeier and Christian Burchard
 Grandezza Mora  CD (1999)

Collaborations

 Missus  Beastly (LP 1970) with Missus Beastly
 Patchwork (CD 1999) with M.T. Wizzard
 Dunarobba (LP 2000) with Militia
 Temporale (CD 2005) with Alhambra
 Fitzcarraldo (CD 2005)  with Popol Vuh
 Portrait (2009) with Uli Trepte
 PSY (2008) with Guru Guru

References

External links
Grandezza Mora
http://www.thing.de/delektro/artikel/eng/ad2/ad-yeti-yogi.html Interview 
https://web.archive.org/web/20110106200851/https://www.thewire.co.uk/articles/60/

German composers
German guitarists
German male guitarists
Living people
1947 births